Agyneta alboguttata is a species of sheet weaver found in the Comoro Islands. It was described by Jocque in 1985.

References

alboguttata
Spiders described in 1985
Spiders of Africa